Kulas is a surname. Notable people include:
 Bri Kulas (born 1992), American basketball player
 Eliezer Kulas (born 1944), Israeli politician
 Janusz Kulas (1936–1972), Polish anti-communist
 Marek Kulas (born 1963), Polish racing cyclist
 Michael Kulas (born 1969), Canadian musician
 Milan Kulas, Czech volleyball player
 Myron Kulas (born 1942), American politician

See also
 
 Kulas, character in Philippine series Dyosa